Jermaine Jackson (born May 22, 1982 in Detroit, Michigan) is a former professional Canadian football wide receiver for the Calgary Stampeders of the Canadian Football League. He was signed by the Port Huron Pirates as a street free agent in 2007. He played college football for the Saginaw Valley State Cardinals.

Jackson has also played for the Fort Wayne Fusion.

External links
Calgary Stampeders bio

1982 births
Living people
American players of Canadian football
American football wide receivers
Calgary Stampeders players
Canadian football wide receivers
Players of American football from Detroit
Saginaw Valley State Cardinals football players
Port Huron Pirates players
Fort Wayne Fusion players